Plerocercoid refers to last larval form, the infective form, found in the second intermediate host of many Cestoda with aquatic life cycles.

References

Cestoda
Larvae